The Hyderabad Superfast Express is a Superfast Express in India which runs between Hyderabad and Chennai Central. It was introduced on 1 April 1965. This train is named after the Hyderabad city. The Southern Railway (SR)  of the Indian Railways administers this train & the train shares its rakes with 22649/22650 Yercaud Express.

Numbering
Train number 12604 runs from Hyderabad to Chennai Central while 12603 runs from Chennai Central to Hyderabad.

Route

The 12604 starts from Hyderabad at 16:50 hours and reaches Chennai Central at 05:55 hours the following day. Similarly the 12603 leaves Chennai Central at 16:45 hours and reaches Hyderabad at 05:45 hours the following day. The train runs via Sullurpeta, Naidupeta, Gudur, Nellore, Kavali, Ongole, Chirala, Bapatla, Nidubrolu, Tenali, Guntur, Sattenapalle, Piduguralla, Nadikudi Jn, Miryalaguda, Nallagonda and Secunderabad

Loco
The train is generally hauled by WAP-4 or WAP 7 from Hyderabad to Chennai Central.

Classes
The 23-coach composition contains– 1 AC First Class, 2 Two-tier AC, 2 Three-tier AC, 13 Sleeper class, 3 General, 2 SLR

See also
 Andhra Pradesh Express
 Visakhapatnam Swarna Jayanti Express
 Padmavati Express
 Rudrama Devi
 Bahubali

References
http://indiarailinfo.com/train/hyderabad-chennai-central-sf-express-12604-hyb-to-mas/315/834/35
http://indiarailinfo.com/train/chennai-central-hyderabad-sf-express-12603-mas-to-hyb/314/35/834

Transport in Chennai
Transport in Hyderabad, India
Rail transport in Telangana
Express trains in India
Rail transport in Tamil Nadu
Rail transport in Andhra Pradesh
Railway services introduced in 1965